SDCL Energy Efficiency Income Trust is a large British investment company dedicated to investments in energy efficiency projects. Established in December 2018, The chairman is Tony Roper. The company is managed by Sustainable Development Capital LLP ('SDCL'). It is listed on the London Stock Exchange and is a constituent of the FTSE 250 Index.

References

2018 establishments in the United Kingdom
Financial services companies established in 2018